Telavar (also, Telovar and Telyavar) is a village and municipality in the Yardymli Rayon of Azerbaijan.  It has a population of 1,221.

Notable natives 

 Bahruz Mansurov — National Hero of Azerbaijan.

References 

Populated places in Yardimli District